HMS Blake, named in honour of Admiral Robert Blake, was the lead ship of her class of protected cruiser that served in the Royal Navy from 1889 to 1922.

She was launched on 23 November 1889 at Chatham Dockyard, but not completed until 2 February 1892.

Service history
After service as the flagship of the North America and West Indies Squadron from 1892 to 1895, Blake served in the Channel Fleet.

In October 1900 she was employed as a temporary transport ship. She returned to Plymouth with the former crew of Royal Arthur in June 1901, and was paid off at Devonport on 15 July 1901 to be refitted.

She was later converted to a destroyer depot ship in 1907, serving through World War I as depot ship to the 11th Destroyer Flotilla of the Grand Fleet, and was finally sold for scrapping on 9 June 1922.

Notes

References
 
 Roger Chesneau and Eugene M. Kolesnik, ed., Conway's All the World's Fighting Ships 1860–1905, (Conway Maritime Press, London, 1979), 
 F.J. Dittmar & J. J. Colledge, British Warships 1914–1919, (Ian Allan, London, 1972), 
 
 

 

Blake-class cruisers
Ships built in Chatham
World War I cruisers of the United Kingdom
1889 ships